Bahram-e Choobin Gorge is a historical and tourist site in the mountains of Kabir Kuh near Sheykh Makan village in Darreh Shahr County in Ilam Province. The gorge is named after Bahram Chobin, a political leader of late Sasanian Empire and as its leader for about a year (r. 590-591). Based on historical accounts, Bahram Chobin took refuge in the gorge during the rebellion against Khosrow II.

References

Canyons and gorges of Iran